Sergei Petrovich Yudin (5 May 1963) was a leading Russian operatic tenor with a lyric voice.  Honored Artist of the Russian Federation in 1933.

Biography
Sergei Petrovich Yudin was born on 8 July 1889 in Moscow to the family of an office employee. From early childhood he showed great artistic gifts and inclinations and studied in the School of Painting, Sculpture and Architecture where one of his teachers was Apollinary Vasnetsov. In 1900-1906 he studied in the Moscow Higher Technical School. Then he was carried away by the idea of being a singer and since 1906 he took lessons from Hryhory Alchevsky. Later he continues his musical education under Professor Alexander Dodonov.

In 1910 Yudin was invited for an audition in the Bolshoi Theatre during which he produced a most favorable impression on the commission members. On 14 February 1911 he made his debut in the Bolshoi in the part of Bayan in Ruslan and Lyudmila by Mikhail Glinka. His debut was a great success but by the decision of the management he was for some time engaged only in secondary roles: The Indian in Sadko by Nikolai Rimsky-Korsakov and Sinodal in The Demon by Anton Rubinstein. The main part in this production was performed by the famous baritone Georges Baklanoff.

His debut in the main role was the part of Lensky in Eugene Onegin by Pyotr Ilyich Tchaikovsky in 1913. His partners were M. Gukova (Tatiana) and I. Gryzunov (Onegin), the conductor being Emil Cooper.

The press published laudatory reviews. On 23 April 1913 the Season’s News wrote: “For the first times, apart from Sobinov, we have heard one more veritable Lensky…”. Yudin was invited to sing this part in the Casino Theater in Monte Carlo where the best singers of Europe, including Feodor Chaliapin, Enrico Caruso and Dmitri Smirnov, performed at that time. However, Yudin declined this invitation as he did not consider himself ready for an international debut at such a high level.

At the beginning of 1914, after some conflict with the Bolshoi management, which continued to underrate him, Yudin became engaged in Sergei Zimin's private opera house where he performed all the leading parts of a lyric tenor and became a leader of a troupe that successfully competed with the Bolshoi. His partners in Zimin's opera-house were outstanding singers of that period. He sang with Feodor Chaliapin in Charles Gounod's Faust, Gioachino Rossini's The Barber of Seville and several other productions.

In 1919 Yudin returned to the Bolshoi, where he performed the repertoire that made him famous in Sergei Zimin's opera. Also he took part in a unique mock production of The Barber of Seville Upside Down, where he performed the part of Rosina and Antonina Nezhdanova performed the part of Count Almaviva. This experiment required a great vocal mastery from the singers: Yudin, who was capable of singing falsetto parts, was singing Rosina's part in the soprano tessitura. The performance was a huge success owing to the excellent acting of the singers in their unusual emploi.

Yudin had a strong voice with a soft timbre, superb vocal technique and artistic mastery.
He could sing falsetto parts and his voice was distinguished by the double timbre: it was close to a tenor altino in the upper register, and close to soprano and in the lower register – to baritone. The critics deemed his voice to be a strong, manly, lyric tenor which overcame all technique difficulties. The manner of singing was simple, dignified, expressive without the affected sweetness common to tenors of that period. He had an excellent diction, delivered every word and every phrase in a meaningful manner with a perfect sense of form and style. Those were the superb qualities of the singer who could refrain from imitation of other tenors of great renown.

In the 1920s Yudin becomes involved in directing operas and training younger singers. In 1932-33 he made a few productions in the Bolshoi having employed a group of young singers: Rigoletto by Giuseppe Verdi, Pagliacci by Ruggero Leoncavallo, Mozart and Salieri by Rimsky-Korsakov.

His vocal career ended in 1941. His last works as a director in the Bolshoi second stage were Tosca by Giacomo Puccini, Dubrovsky by Eduard Nápravník and The Barber of Seville by Gioachino Rossini.

During World War II Yudin worked as a director and a teacher in the Moscow Opera Studio. One of his pupils was his daughter Tatiana Sergeyevna Yudina, the future soloist of the Stanislavski and Nemirovich-Danchenko Moscow Academic Music Theatre and of the All-Union Radio.

From 1948 until 1963 Yudin was a professor at the Moscow Conservatory. His book “The Singer and His Voice” was published in 1947. He described his stage and teaching experience in it.

Yudin's family lived in a five-room apartment in Ogaryov street 3, apt. 62.
The walls of the apartment were adorned by Italian landscapes painted by Sergei Yudin's brother and by maquettes of the scenes of operatic productions. The family spent summers in their dacha in Nikolina Gora. To the last days of his life Yudin lived for his profession and his art.

Sergei Petrovich Yudin died on 5 July 1963. He was buried in Novodevichy Cemetery, plot 8 row 30.

Selected operatic parts 
 Alfredo in La traviata by Giuseppe Verdi
 Bagoas in Judith by Alexander Serov
 Bayan in Ruslan and Lyudmila by Mikhail Glinka
 Canio in Pagliacci by Ruggero Leoncavallo
 Count Almaviva in The Barber of Seville by Gioachino Rossini
 Erekle in Il tradimento by Mikhail Ippolitov-Ivanov
 Faust in Faust by Charles Gounod
 Fra Diavolo in Fra Diavolo ou L’hotellerie de Terracin by Daniel Auber
 Gérald in Lakmé by Léo Delibes
 Le Chevalier des Grieux in Manon by Jules Massenet
 Lensky in Eugene Onegin by Pyotr Ilyich Tchaikovsky in 1913
 Levko in May Night by Nikolai Rimsky-Korsakov
 Lohengrin in Lohengrin by Richard Wagner
 Mozart in Mozart and Salieri by Nikolai Rimsky-Korsakov
 Muri in The Mandarin's Son by César Cui, 1914
 Nadir in Les pêcheurs de perles by Georges Bizet
 Prince Leopold in La Juive by Fromental Halévy, 1914
 Prince Sinodal in The Demon by Anton Rubinstein
 Rodolfo in La bohème by Giacomo Puccini
 Roméo in Roméo et Juliette by Charles Gounod
 Ryleyev in Decembrists by Vasily Zolotarev
 Schukar in Virgin Soil Upturned (Podnyataya tselina) by Ivan Dzerzhinsky in 1938
 The Astrologer in The Golden Cockerel by Nikolai Rimsky-Korsakov in 1924
 The Duke in Rigoletto by Giuseppe Verdi in 1929
 The Indian in Sadko by Nikolai Rimsky-Korsakov
 Tsar Berendey in The Snow Maiden by Nikolai Rimsky-Korsakov
 Vladimir Dubrovsky in Dubrovsky by Eduard Nápravník
 Vladimir Igorevich in Prince Igor by Alexander Borodin

Sources

1889 births
1963 deaths
Singers from Moscow
Burials at Novodevichy Cemetery
Soviet tenors